Sidney S. Liufau (born 22 November 1963) is an American actor best known for role of Lt. Manuele Atoa in the Star Trek: Deep Space Nine episode "You Are Cordially Invited". Liufau also appeared in Hawaii Five-O, Street Warrior, Blade, Faster, Planet of the Apes and You, Me and Dupree.

Career
Liufau made his acting debut in the 1995 film Batman Forever, which also featured co-star René Auberjonois. The same year, he appeared in the Baywatch movie Forbidden Paradise. Liufau went on to have small roles in the films A Very Brady Sequel (1996), Bloodsport III (1997, starring John Rhys-Davies), Marvel Comics' Blade (1998, with Judson Earney Scott, Andray Johnson), Dirt Merchant (1999, with Lee Arenberg) and Code of the Dragon (2001, with Brad Dourif and Cary-Hiroyuki Tagawa). More recently, he had a supporting role in the 2006 comedy You, Me and Dupree, which also featured Star Trek: Enterprise guest star Todd Stashwick.

In addition to his film work, Liufau also had a role in an unsold TV pilot called Red Skies (as did Leonard Kelly-Young), TV Pilot Honolulu CRU starring Russell Wong, Michael Rooker and Lori Petty, also guest-starred on an episode of The District, starring Roger Aaron Brown and Ernest Borgnine. He most recently had a recurring role on the short-lived CBS action series Smith, working with series regular Virginia Madsen and fellow guest actors Ray Liotta and Simon Baker. He also appeared in Alex Kurtzman's and Roberto Orci's remake of Hawaii Five-O in the episode "Malama Ka Aina" as Daniel Dae Kim's character's cousin.

Filmography

Film

Television

References

External links

Living people
American male actors
1963 births